Kalaigaon Assembly constituency is one of the 126 assembly constituencies of Assam Legislative Assembly. Kalaigaon forms part of the Mangaldoi Lok Sabha constituency.

Members of Legislative Assembly 

 1951: Dandi Ram Dutta, Socialist Party
 1952: Dandi Ram Dutta, Praja Socialist Party
 1962: Dandi Ram Dutta, Indian National Congress
 1967: Dandi Ram Dutta, Indian National Congress
 1972: Lakshmi Kanta Saikia, Indian National Congress
 1978: Nagen Sarma, Janata Party
 1985: Mohendra Mohan Rai Choudhury, Independent
 1991: Jew Ram Boro, Independent
 1996: Mahendra Mohan Rai Choudhury, Asom Gana Parishad
 2001: Nathu Boro, Independent
 2006: Maheswar Baro, Independent
 2011: Mukunda Ram Choudhury, Asom Gana Parishad
 2016: Maheswar Baro, Bodoland People's Front
 2021: Durga Das Boro, Bodoland People's Front

Election results

2021 result

1952 By-election

References

External links 
 

Assembly constituencies of Assam